Gino Coutinho (born 5 August 1982) is a Dutch former footballer, who played as a goalkeeper.

Club career
Coutinho has played for PSV Eindhoven, NAC, Vitesse and ADO Den Haag in the Dutch Eredivisie. Only at Den Haag in the 2010/2011 season he claimed a regular place in the starting line-up, mainly because of injury to first choice goalkeeper Robert Zwinkels. He left them to join Excelsior in September 2014.

He moved to AZ on a free in summer 2015.

PSV Eindhoven

Coutinho played for SV Real Lunet before he was discovered by PSV. In the 2000–01 season, Coutinho played four times for PSV. During the 2001–02 season, Coutinho failed to make an appearance for PSV, so he was loaned out to Den Bosch for the following campaign.

International career
He capped for Netherlands in 2001 FIFA World Youth Championship in Argentina.

Honours

Club
PSV
Eredivisie (1): 2000–01

References

External links
 
 Voetbal International profile 

1982 births
Living people
Sportspeople from 's-Hertogenbosch
Footballers from North Brabant
Dutch sportspeople of Surinamese descent
Association football goalkeepers
Dutch footballers
Netherlands youth international footballers
Netherlands under-21 international footballers
Eredivisie players
Eerste Divisie players
Derde Divisie players
PSV Eindhoven players
FC Den Bosch players
NAC Breda players
SBV Vitesse players
ADO Den Haag players
Excelsior Rotterdam players
AZ Alkmaar players
Jong AZ players
NEC Nijmegen players
Sparta Nijkerk players